Sonic the Hedgehog is an animated television series based on the video game series of the same name. It was story edited by Len Janson and produced by DIC Productions, Sega of America, and the Italian studio Reteitalia in association with Telecinco. It is the second of DiC's Sonic cartoons, following Adventures of Sonic the Hedgehog. It features a more dramatic and dark story than the lighter Adventures series, depicting Sonic as a member of a band of freedom fighters battling to overthrow Dr. Robotnik, now a despotic dictator who conquered their home planet Mobius years prior, ruling it as a polluted industrial dystopia. To distinguish it from other Sonic the Hedgehog media, the series is commonly referred to by fans as "SatAM", in reference to its Saturday morning timeslot.

The program aired for two seasons with a total of 26 episodes on ABC from September 18, 1993, to December 3, 1994, and continued in reruns until 1995. A third season was planned, but ABC canceled the show, ending it with a cliffhanger. Despite its cancellation, a fan following has elevated the series to become a cult hit. The show also inspired a video game, Sonic Spinball, and a long-running comic book series of the same name.

Plot
The series takes place on Mobius, a planet mostly populated by anthropomorphic animals. The Kingdom of Acorn, based within the metropolitan city of Mobotropolis, was at war with an unseen enemy. King Acorn recruited a human scientist named Julian to build war machines to end the war with a victory. However, during peacetime, Julian and his nephew Snively launched a coup d'état against the kingdom. The King is banished to another dimension called the Void and most of the citizens are captured and permanently transformed into robot slaves, through a machine called the Roboticizer. Julian renames himself as Dr. Robotnik, now the dictator of Mobius. Mobotropolis is renamed Robotropolis, a polluted, industrial cityscape.

Robotnik finds himself at odds with a small collective group called the Freedom Fighters, who operate out of the hidden woodland village of Knothole. They are led by Sonic the Hedgehog and Princess Sally Acorn, King Acorn's sole heir. Other members include Sonic's best friend Miles "Tails" Prower, computer genius Rotor the Walrus, French coyote Antoine Depardieu, half-roboticized Bunnie Rabbot, and Dulcy the Dragon. They act as a rebellion against Robotnik's regime. Sonic uses the Power Rings to gain a temporary boost in power. Both the rings and the Roboticizer were designed by Sonic's uncle Chuck, one of the victims of the machine.

Early on in the series, Sonic uses a Power Ring to restore Uncle Chuck's free will in his mechanical body. Chuck decides to act as a spy for the Freedom Fighters, operating from within the city. He is eventually discovered by Robotnik in the second season and escapes to Knothole. Sally searches for her father during the series. He is found alive within the Void, shared with the sorcerer Naugus who was also imprisoned within the dimension by his former associate Robotnik. Naugus attempts to escape the Void, but both he and King Acorn discover their bodies turn to crystal if they leave the Void due to their prolonged exposure to it. King Acorn gives his daughter a list of known Freedom Fighters that they can make use of in their fight against Robotnik. The heroes gain other allies including Ari the Ram, and Lupe, leader of the elusive wolf pack.

In the series' sole two-part episode, "Blast to the Past", Sonic and Sally use the Time Stones to travel back in time, in an attempt to prevent Robotnik's planned takeover. They fail, but manage to get their younger selves to the safety of Knothole, with help from Sally's nanny Rosie Woodchuck.

In the series finale, Robotnik builds the Doomsday Project to destroy the population. The Freedom Fighters launch a full-scale attack against Robotnik, with Sonic and Sally destroying the Doomsday Project with the power of the Deep Power Stones. Robotnik is caught in the destruction and is utterly destroyed along with Doomsday and the Freedom Fighters declare victory, with Sonic and Sally kissing. In a final scene, Snively becomes the main antagonist, accompanied out of the remains of an elevator by an unseen ally with red eyes. Ben Hurst, one of the series' writers, confirmed the figure was Naugus.

Characters

Knothole Freedom Fighters
 Sonic (voiced by Jaleel White as his older self, Tahj Mowry as his younger self) is a blue hedgehog and the main protagonist of the series. He is able to run at superhuman speed, and is the only Freedom Fighter capable of using magical rings called Power Rings. Sonic has an impatient and head-strong personality, but is also fearless, heroic, and well-meaning. He always mockingly refers to Robotnik as "Ro-butt-nik".
 Princess Sally Alicia Acorn (voiced by Kath Soucie as her older self, Lindsay Ridgeway as her younger self) is a chipmunk who is the rightful princess of Mobotropolis and Sonic's love interest. As a strategist and leader of the Knothole Freedom Fighters, she is knowledgeable and the voice of reason. Sally tries to keep Sonic grounded. She is known for her compassion and master diplomacy.
 Bunnie Rabbot (voiced by Christine Cavanaugh) is a rabbit with a southern accent. Half of her body was roboticized, leaving her left arm and both legs mechanical. She is skilled in martial arts and wants to be returned to normal.
 Antoine "Ant" Depardieu (voiced by Rob Paulsen) is a coyote with a French accent whose awkwardness often places the others in danger and gets him captured. He has some difficulty speaking English. He has romantic feelings for Princess Sally, and attempts to impress her. However, his selfishness hinders this goal. Sonic often teases Antoine over his shortcomings.
 Rotor (voiced by Mark Ballou in Season 1 and Cam Brainard in Season 2)  is a walrus and the mechanic of Knothole Village. He provides the Knothole Freedom Fighters with useful inventions, and accompanies them on infiltrations.
 Tails (voiced by Bradley Pierce) is a young two-tailed fox who idolizes Sonic. While usually left behind in Knothole, he proves useful in deadly missions. 
 Nicole (voiced by Kath Soucie) is a portable computer that Sally uses to hack into Robotnik's technology. Nicole speaks in a female monotone, and exhibits artificial intelligence. It is indicated that Sally received Nicole from her father.
 Dulcy (voiced by Cree Summer) is a young dragon, who provides the Knothole Freedom Fighters with transportation. Sporting powerful lungs, Dulcy can blow enemies away and burn/freeze them with fire or ice breath. She has trouble landing, and often crashes mid-flight. She was introduced in Season 2.

Villains
 Dr. Julian Robotnik (voiced by Jim Cummings) is a human warlord who seeks to cover Mobius in machinery and transform its population into robotic slaves by roboticizing them. He is chiefly opposed by the Knothole Freedom Fighters. Robotnik's obsession with destroying Sonic is often his downfall. In this version, his real first name is Julian, adopting the moniker "Robotnik" after his takeover.
 Snively (voiced by Charlie Adler) is Robotnik's nephew and personal assistant. He is constantly abused by his uncle. As such, Snively hates Robotnik and plots behind his back.
 Naugus (voiced by Michael Bell) is a powerful humanoid sorcerer of indeterminate species with bat-like ears, a rhinoceros horn on his head, a crustacean-like claw for a left hand, and a lizard-like tail. He resents his former associate Robotnik for betraying and imprisoning him within the Void. Naugus desires retribution, but he cannot escape without turning into crystal due to him being in the Void for too long as he can no longer exist outside the void.
 Cluck (vocal effects provided by Frank Welker) is a robotic chicken-like bird and the only creature Robotnik shows affection towards.
 Swat-Bots (voiced by Jim Cummings and Frank Welker) are Robotnik's primary henchmen and foot soldiers.

Recurring
 Sir Charles "Chuck" Hedgehog (voiced by William Windom) is Sonic's uncle, and the inventor of the Roboticizer before Robotnik stole it. He was roboticized and made into one of Robotnik's slaves, until Sonic restored his memory. He serves as a spy for the Freedom Fighters. According to Robby London, he was named after the writer and animator, Chuck Menville, who died in 1992.
 Ari Ram (voiced by Dorian Harewood) is a Freedom Fighter who worked as a double agent for Robotnik, only to be betrayed later and trapped in the Void. He is later rescued by Sonic and joins the Knothole Freedom Fighters.
 King Acorn (voiced by Tim Curry) is the former king of Mobotropolis and Sally's father. He was banished to the Void during Robotnik's takeover, and like Naugus, cannot escape without turning into crystal due to prolonged exposure to the Void. But before returning to the Void, he gives Sally the list of all the Freedom Fighter groups in Mobius, telling her to find them, unify them under her banner and establish a Freedom Fighter network so they can be strong enough to overthrow Robotnik once and for all.
 Lupe Wolf (voiced by Shari Belafonte) – Leader of the Wolfpack Freedom Fighters and one of the Knothole Freedom Fighters' allies in the fight against Robotnik.

Voice cast
 
 Jaleel White as Sonic the Hedgehog
 Charlie Adler as Snively
 Jim Cummings as Dr. Julian Robotnik, Swat-Bots
 Christine Cavanaugh as Bunnie Rabbot
 Rob Paulsen as Antoine Depardieu
 Bradley Pierce as Miles "Tails" Prower
 Kath Soucie as Princess Sally Acorn
 Cree Summer as Dulcy the Dragon
 Frank Welker as Cluck, Swat-Bots
 William Windom as Uncle Chuck
 Tim Curry as King Acorn

Crew
 Marsha Gooodman - Casting director
 Ginny McSwain - Casting director and voice director

Production
Sonic the Hedgehog was created by DiC Animation City in association with Sega of America, which produced a total of 26 episodes for its two-season run, and the Italian studio Reteitalia S.p.A., part of Fininvest company in association with Telecinco. The show's animation was outsourced to the Korean studio Sae Rom Production and Spanish studio Milimetros.

Before production began, Sega of America CEO Tom Kalinske and its newly appointed consumer products director Michealene Risley approached DiC Entertainment's CEO Andy Heyward and the ABC network to produce a television show featuring Sonic. After being shown the character, Heyward agreed to make the show and was granted the license. According to Robby London, DiC originally made a deal to produce only the Saturday morning Sonic series for the ABC network, which was originally planned to air in the Fall of 1992. The cartoon was to be more light-hearted compared to the final product, as reflected by the episode "Heads or Tails", early promotional material found in Fleetway's Sonic the Comic and the early issues of Sonic the Hedgehog comics by Archie, which were based on the Saturday morning Sonic cartoon. However, DiC also wanted to expand the show and produce additional episodes for weekday syndication as well, similar to what DiC had previously done with The Real Ghostbusters, but Mark Pedowitz, the then-senior vice president of business affairs and contracts at ABC, who expected the Sonic cartoon to air exclusively on ABC, rejected the idea, telling London "If you guys want to do syndication, be our guest, go with God, but you won’t be on our network."

ABC would not agree to the deal until London came with a proposition that DiC would produce a separate, vastly different Sonic show for syndication instead, the result of which became Adventures of Sonic the Hedgehog. Afterwards, ABC was at first willing to air only a single half-hour episode as a prime-time special scheduled to air in March 1993 (which would become the episode "Heads or Tails") before ultimately delaying it and including it as part of the show which ABC picked up again for a full season, this time airing in the Fall of 1993, alongside Adventures airing in syndication at the same time. During that time, the Saturday morning Sonic cartoon received a makeover and was made darker and more serious in order to distinguish itself from the syndicated Sonic cartoon. The show bible for the Saturday morning Sonic cartoon was written in February 1992 with the final revision made on March 10, 1993.

Episodes

Series overview

Season 1 (1993)

Season 2 (1994)

Broadcast and distribution

Initial run
The Saturday morning series differs from Adventures of Sonic the Hedgehog, which premiered two weeks earlier and aired on weekday afternoons in syndication. While Adventures is lighthearted and comical, Sonic the Hedgehog featured a comparatively complex plot and dramatic atmosphere. It explored unusual story concepts for animation, including losing loved ones to war and relationships focusing on young couples.

While featuring a darker tone in comparison to Adventures, the Saturday morning show's first season had an episodic structure and aired out of order, however the second season featured a story arc (which would've continued in the later seasons, had the show not been cancelled). At ABC's request, the second season included episodes devoted to humor, while darker and dramatic elements were reduced. Other changes in season two include Princess Sally donning a jacket, Dulcy the Dragon being added to the cast and Rotor receiving a new design. ABC also ended up, in some weeks, airing back-to-back episodes of this show during the 1st season, while in Season 2, each time slot for the show was for a single episode only.

Syndication
After the program's initial run, it appeared on the USA Network's Action Extreme Team block from June 1997 to January 1998. ABC did not replicate this, replacing Sonic with reruns of Free Willy. Sonic the Hedgehog aired in Canada on the CTV Network, with a bonus summer run between June 10 and September 2, 1995. It has not been rerun on broadcast or cable television in Canada since its cancellation on CTV, but was present on the Shomi video-on-demand platform until its November 30, 2016, closure. In 2004, it started airing on Spacetoon TV in the MENA region until May 2015. All scenes with depicted romance have been censored due to federal laws in MENA.

From 1994 to 1996, it had a complete run on the UK television on ITV and Channel 4, In December 1994, the first season was broadcast in the Republic of Ireland on RTÉ2. On September 2, 2016, reruns of the series began airing on Starz. As of 2020, the show can be found on Pluto TV (although it was found from 2017) and on demand at Paramount+, as well as YouTube. On March 15, 2021, it began airing in Malaysia on new kids channel named TA-DAA!.

Home releases

This show has never been reissued on DVD after its expiration in 2012, but the remaining copies are available on Amazon and eBay with expensive prices. However, the complete series is available to purchase and download on iTunes.

In other media

Comics

Archie's Sonic the Hedgehog comic book was initially based on the Saturday morning cartoon. From its earliest issues, the book shared the characters and story premise established within it. However, the comic differed in that it featured humorous plots modeled after the weekday show. After writer Ken Penders had the opportunity to view the Saturday morning program, the comic gradually became adventure-driven.

The comic series shifted focus again after ABC cancelled Sonic the Hedgehog, developing into a relationship-based superhero story, and following a reboot, Archie's Sonic was primarily inspired by the video game series. Nevertheless, the characters and locales from the Saturday morning cartoon remained prominent until the comic's cancellation in July 2017.

Video games

Several video games were intended to use elements from the TV series, although only one was completed. This was Sonic Spinball, released in 1993 for the Sega Genesis. It contained characters from the show, including Princess Sally, Bunnie Rabbot, Rotor and Muttski. Spinball was commissioned due to Sonic the Hedgehog 3 being pushed back from its intended 1993 release in the holiday shopping season to February 1994, with the game being developed in under a year. An 8-bit port of the game was also released for the Master System and Game Gear due to the poor reception of Sonic Drift in Japan.

Another video game tentatively titled Sonic-16 was intended to be set in the same universe, with a prototype being created by Sega Technical Institute in November 1993. However, Yuji Naka and Sega management disliked the project, allgedly due to its slow-paced nature, and it was soon cancelled without any further development. Directly afterwards, the same team worked on Sonic Mars; this would have featured Princess Sally and Bunnie Rabbot as playable characters. This project eventually evolved into Sonic X-treme, which was cancelled in 1996 due to development difficulties.

Feature film attempts 

In 2002, writer Ben Hurst attempted to pitch an animated film in order to revive the series. Hurst said that he proposed his idea of "a feature film to be the Third Season of SatAM" to a Sega executive, who was interested in the project, and that he later received a call from Ken Penders, head writer of the Sonic the Hedgehog comic series by Archie Comics, who had been alerted about the movie. Hurst stated he told him to relay his strategy to Sega in an attempt to get them interested, however after calling Sega back, his contact's demeanor had completely changed; they angrily stated that Sega is paid to develop Sonic projects, rather than paying others to do so. Hurst theorized that Penders had told them about their strategy in a "less-than-flattering way", and that he implied he would be the writer of a Sonic movie.

Penders would later pitch Sega his own concept for a movie in 2003 based on the Archie comic, under the name Sonic Armageddon. Not much is known about the pitch, except that the film would have followed Sonic and friends after their home planet of Mobius explodes, something shown in pitch art and stated by Penders himself. According to Penders, he had the support of both X-Men director Larry Hudson and Sega of America licensing manager Robert Leffer behind him, and cites the opportunity to make the film as to why he left his position as lead writer of the Sonic comic at Archie. He created four pieces of concept art and a homemade pitch video, but the project never materialised due to the death of Leffer and what Penders described as "massive corporate upheaval" at Sega sometime in 2007.

Team Sea3on 

From 2019 onwards, a group of fans calling themselves 'Team Sea3on' spun out from the online "FUS" community ("Fans United for Satam") and began work on bringing a third season of the programme to life, basing the plotlines on both Ben Hurst's original notes as well as the group's active webcomic. The group are presently working within 'proper legal channels' to advance the project with Sega's awareness. The effort gained attention from the likes of IGN. In April 2022, a full teaser trailer was uploaded to the group's YouTube channel, with a cover of the Satam theme song "Fastest Thing Alive" by Johnny Gioeli of Crush 40.

Reception
Sonic the Hedgehog ranked No. 9 for all of Saturday Morning with a 5.2 rating, an estimated 4.8 million viewers during its first season.

The first season received an approval rating of 40% on review aggregator website Rotten Tomatoes, based on five reviews. Patrick Lee of The A.V. Club gave it a positive review, saying that "the show pushed its cartoon animal characters to the most dramatic places they could go without venturing into self-parody. Over the course of the series, the characters dealt with loss, romance, and death [...] The entire series successfully pulled off that sort of balancing act, and even 20 years later, it’s still a solid Saturday morning cartoon". Mark Bozon of IGN criticized the show as dated, considering it "so bad, it's good." Writing for DVD Talk, Todd Douglass Jr. remarked that Sonic didn't stand the test of time. Overall, he considered it to be of low quality, although he found the stories "Ultra Sonic" and "Blast to the Past" to be "the crème of the crop."

Luke Owen of Flickering Myth felt Sonic aged better than is often supposed, praising its well-executed characterizations and treatment of war, although he considered Antoine to be "one of the worst characters committed to a cartoon series." GamesRadar listed the show as one of "the worst things to happen to Sonic." It criticized its plot and characters as "unwanted". The Escapist journalist Bob Chipman credited the series with providing a viably menacing take on Doctor Robotnik, and an engaging narrative. Bob Mackey of USgamer wrote that the cartoon's writing didn't live up to its intriguing premise. In particular, he argued that the Antoine character perpetrated negative French stereotypes.

Notes

References

External links

 Sonic the Hedgehog at the Big Cartoon DataBase
 

1990s American animated television series
1990s American comic science fiction television series
1993 American television series debuts
1994 American television series endings
American Broadcasting Company original programming
American children's animated action television series
American children's animated comic science fiction television series
American children's animated science fantasy television series
American children's animated space adventure television series
American television shows based on video games
Animated series based on Sonic the Hedgehog
Animated television series about hedgehogs
Dystopian animated television series
English-language television shows
Italian children's animated action television series
Italian children's animated adventure television series
Italian children's animated comic science fiction television series
Italian children's animated science fantasy television series
Television series by DIC Entertainment
Television series set on fictional planets